DXXM (97.7 FM) is a radio station owned by Subic Broadcasting Corporation and operated by People's Radio And Broadcasting Services. Its studios are located at the Ground Floor, Door 18, Bougainvilla St., Brgy. Ising, Carmen, Davao del Norte, and its transmitter is located at Mawab, Compostela Valley.

References

External links
DXXM FB Page

Radio stations in Davao del Norte
Christian radio stations in the Philippines
Radio stations established in 2018